Plozévet is a commune in the Finistère department of Brittany in north-western France. Plozévet is twinned with the village of Hartland, Devon, UK.

Population
Inhabitants of Plozévet are called in French Plozévetiens.

Geography

Historically it belongs to Cornouaille and Pays Bigouden.

Map

Breton language
The municipality launched a linguistic plan concerning the Breton language through Ya d'ar brezhoneg on November 23, 2007.

In 2008, 17.70% of primary-school children attended bilingual schools.

See also
Communes of the Finistère department
The wreck of the Droits de l'Homme, 1797

References

External links

Official website 

Mayors of Finistère Association 

Communes of Finistère